Spotswood can refer to:

People:

Alexander Spotswood (1676–1740), the Lieutenant-Governor of Virginia
Denis Spotswood

Places:
Spotswood, Victoria, a suburb of Melbourne, Australia
Spotswood railway station
Spotswood, New Jersey
Spotswood, New Zealand, a suburb of New Plymouth

Institutions:
Robert L. Spotswood House in Mobile, Alabama, U.S.
Spotswood College in New Zealand
Spotswood High School (disambiguation) — various high schools

Film:
 Spotswood, a 1992 Australian film starring Anthony Hopkins

See also
 Spottiswoode (disambiguation)
 Spottswood (disambiguation)